Neil Stephens  (born 1 October 1963 in Canberra) is an Australian former road bicycle racer. He won the Australian national road race title in 1991 and 1994.

He is a Tour de France stage winner and is one of the relatively few riders to have completed the three Grand Tours (Giro d'Italia, Tour de France and Vuelta a España) in a calendar year, as well as being the first Australian to complete the feat. He was involved in the Festina doping scandal in 1998 Tour de France. He claimed that he took EPO but believed he was taking vitamin supplements intravenously. In late 2007,  announced that Neil Stephens would be the team's new sport director.

Stephens was awarded the Medal of the Order of Australia (OAM) in the 1996 Australia Day Honours for his service to cycling and the Australian Sports Medal in September 2000 in recognition of his Tour de France stage win.

Major results

1986
1st and Fastest Time Alex Roberts "100" Mile one day Classic Mount Gambier South Australia
1st, Overall, Herald Sun Tour
1988
1st, Stage 10, Milk Race
1990
1st, Stage 13, Herald Sun Tour
1st, Stage 5, Volta a Portugal
1991
  National Road Race Championship
1st, GP Villafranca de Ordizia
1992
1st, Trofeo Calvià (Vuelta a Mallorca)
1993
1st, GP Villafranca de Ordizia
1st, Stage 3, Bicicleta Vasca
1994
1st, GP Villafranca de Ordizia
1995
 National Road Race Championship
1st, GP Villafranca de Ordizia
1st, Overall, Tasmania Summer Tour
1st, Prologue & Stage 3
1996
1st, Overall, Vuelta a Andalucía
1st, Stage 5, Tour of the Basque Country
1997
1st, Stage 17, Tour de France
1998
1st, Stages 3 & 5, Tasmania Summer Tour

References

External links
Palmarès by cyclingbase.com 

1963 births
Living people
Australian male cyclists
Sportspeople from Canberra
Olympic cyclists of Australia
Cyclists at the 1996 Summer Olympics
Australian Tour de France stage winners
Sportsmen from the Australian Capital Territory
Doping cases in Australian cycling
Cyclists from the Australian Capital Territory
Recipients of the Medal of the Order of Australia
Recipients of the Australian Sports Medal